Asset Sekenovich Mambetov (born 10 June 1982, in Altyn-Shoky, Kazahstan) is a Kazakh wrestler, who initially won a bronze medal at the 2008 Summer Olympics. He is a trainer for heavyweight wrestlers in Kazakhstan. On 17 November 2016 the IOC disqualified him from the 2008 Olympic Games, stripped his Olympic medal and struck his results from the record for failing a drugs test in a re-analysis of his doping sample from 2008.

References

External links
 

Competitors stripped of Summer Olympics medals
Olympic wrestlers of Kazakhstan
Wrestlers at the 2004 Summer Olympics
Wrestlers at the 2008 Summer Olympics
1982 births
Living people
Asian Games medalists in wrestling
Wrestlers at the 2002 Asian Games
Wrestlers at the 2010 Asian Games
Kazakhstani male sport wrestlers
Asian Games silver medalists for Kazakhstan
Doping cases in wrestling
Kazakhstani sportspeople in doping cases
Medalists at the 2010 Asian Games
21st-century Kazakhstani people